Viktar Sotnikaw (born 27 July 2001) is a Belarusian professional footballer who plays for Bunyodkor on loan from BATE Borisov.

Honours
Shakhtyor Soligorsk
Belarusian Premier League champion: 2020, 2021, 2022
Belarusian Cup winner: 2018–19

References

External links 
 
 

2001 births
Living people
People from Stolin District
Sportspeople from Brest Region
Belarusian footballers
Belarus youth international footballers
Association football defenders
Belarusian expatriate footballers
Expatriate footballers in Uzbekistan
FC Shakhtyor Soligorsk players
FC BATE Borisov players
FC Bunyodkor players